Endor ( ʽÊndōr, En Dor in the NKJV) was a Canaanite city, which is listed in the Book of Joshua as one of the cities the Israelites didn't manage to dispossess, neither the city nor its dependencies. It was located between the Hill of Moreh and Mount Tabor in the Jezreel Valley. It is mentioned twice more in the Hebrew Bible, in 1 Samuel and in Psalm 83.

Etymology 
The original meaning of "Endor" is unknown and its spelling in Hebrew varies. It may be connected with the words ein meaning "spring" and dor, meaning "generation".

In the Bible 

In , Saul consulted a medium or witch at Endor, who lived in the village, on the evening before the Battle of Gilboa, in which he perished.

Location 
The location of the ancient site of Endor is widely debated and many locations have been suggested. From the biblical accounts, an Endor that is located on the south edge of the Jezreel Valley seems to fit best. The tribal allotments of Manasseh, Saul's journey to Endor and the defeat of Sisera's army all fit well with a location that is on this side of the valley, somewhere between Ibleam and Ta'anach. However, there are difficulties with this location. From the origin of the name, a spring must also be located somewhere near, and archaeological evidence from the time of Joshua, Judges, and Saul is required.

Many suggested sites are located on the north side of the Jezreel Valley, near or on the Hill of Moreh. The main reasons for this placement are due to tradition and name preservation. The major difficulty in a northern location for Endor is that it does not seem to fit the biblical accounts well. The city lists in Joshua 17:11 and  would be mentioning Endor out of logical order. In spite of this, a supporting factor for a northern site is that Saul had to be disguised as he traveled to the witch at Endor. This is usually attributed to the fact that Endor was behind enemy lines, since the Philistines were camped at Shunem, just southwest of the most accepted Endor site. Those who hold to a southern site location explain the disguise as necessary not to transverse any enemy lines, but to hide Saul's identity from the medium. Both explanations are possible. The following sites have been suggested:

 Khirbet Jadurah: This site is located on the south edge of the Jezreel Valley, but with no spring the site has been deemed incorrect.
 Tell Qedesh / Tell abu Qudeis; This tell is a much better site than Khirbet Jadurah and it is located on the south edge of the Jezreel Valley. It has two springs nearby, remains from the right time periods, and a walled city area. Proponents for a southern Endor usually hold to this as the correct site for ancient Endor.
The small hill, on the east side of the Hill of Moreh, is 211 meters high. Archaeologists have uncovered tombs and a spring inside a cave. The spring was named Fountain of Dor after it was believed to be the ancient site of Endor. This site is distinct from Tell el-Ajjul in the Gaza Strip and the ancient village of Ajjul north of Jerusalem.
 Indur, Endur, En-dor: The Palestinian  Arab town of Indur, depopulated during the 1948 Arab-Israeli war, preserved the name of the ancient site. Excavations were carried out on Indur, but with no remains found at the site, it was largely ruled out as being ancient Endor.
 Khirbet Safsafeh / Es-Safsafa: Many believe Khirbet Safsafeh to be the site of ancient En-dor, as reflected as being the site most normally marked on maps. Two wadis drain from this location, one to the northeast and the other to the northwest. During the Roman Period, there was a large population on the site. It was later inhabited by Arabs until they abandoned it in 1948 due to the war. After the war, Israelis settled it and named it Ein Dor. Tradition seems to be the best support for Khirbet Safsafeh. Since the 4th century CE, Endor has been recognized by early Christian pilgrims and by the Crusaders as Biblical Endor. During the Crusader Period it was mentioned by Brocardus, a 14th-century German priest. When Edward Robinson came upon the site, he described it as an ordinary village. C. Conder and H. Kitchener also recognized the site and described it as a small village. Name preservation also supports Khirbet Safsafeh as being ancient Endor, for although the site does not preserve the ancient name, its nearby neighbor to the northeast, Indur, did. The modern village could have easily moved from the ancient site, taking the name with it.

See also 
 Ein Dor (kibbutz)
 Witch of Endor

References

Bibliography 

Hebrew Bible cities
Witch of Endor